Cnephasia pasiuana, the meadow shade, is a moth of the family Tortricidae. It was described by Jacob Hübner in 1799. It is found in almost all of Europe. The habitat consists of rough pastures, fens and marshy areas.

The wingspan is 15–19 mm. The forewing pattern varies from pale to dark grey. Meyrick describes it - Antennal cilia of male very short. Thorax crested. Forewings elongate, costa moderately arched, 7 to apex; fuscous, finely irrorated with whitish-ochreous; an angulated fascia at 1/3, central fascia, and apical suffused patch darker, sometimes obsolete. Hindwings pale fuscous, darker terminally, 6 and 7 stalked. The larva yellowish-grey; spots black.

There is one generation per year, with adults on wing from June to July.

The larvae feed on the flowers of various herbaceous plants, primarily Asteraceae species. They have been recorded feeding on Agropyron, Pisum, Brassica, Medicago, Humulus, as well as Ranunculus species. They spin together several petals of their host plant.

References

Moths described in 1799
pasiuana
Moths of Europe
Insects of Turkey